Kanebogen is part of the town of Harstad within Harstad Municipality in Troms county, Norway. Kanebogen borders the neighborhoods of Gangsås to the north, Stangnes to the northeast, Medkila to the south, and Grønnebakkan to the northwest.

Kanebogen School and the adjacent Kanebogen Stadion (stadium) are located in this area, as are Harstad Camping, Kanebogen Church, and the Kanebogen Senter (shopping center).

Kanebogen was the northernmost part of the old municipality of Sandtorg which was merged with Harstad in 1964.

References

Harstad